Chauncey 
is a village in Athens County, Ohio, United States. The population was 1,049 at the 2010 census. The village is located near The Plains.

Geography
Chauncey is located at  (39.400100, -82.128569), along Sunday Creek just above its confluence with the Hocking River. A small portion of the village is in low-lying flood plain and even floodway, which is prone to flooding.

History
Chauncey was laid out in 1839. The village was named for Elihu Chauncey, a businessperson in the mining industry. A post office called Chauncey has been in operation since 1838.

Demographics

2010 census
As of the census of 2010, there were 1,049 people, 423 households, and 262 families living in the village. The racial makeup of the village was 96.6% White, 0.9% African American, 0.3% Native American, 0.4% Asian, 0.1% Pacific Islander, 0.1% from other races, and 1.7% from two or more races. Hispanic or Latino of any race were 0.6% of the population.

There were 423 households, of which 30.5% had children under the age of 18 living with them, 39.0% were married couples living together, 16.5% had a female householder with no husband present, 6.4% had a male householder with no wife present, and 38.1% were non-families. 29.6% of all households were made up of individuals, and 9.7% had someone living alone who was 65 years of age or older. The average household size was 2.48 and the average family size was 3.00.

The median age in the village was 37.4 years. 24.2% of residents were under the age of 18; 10.9% were between the ages of 18 and 24; 24.8% were from 25 to 44; 26.9% were from 45 to 64; and 13.3% were 65 years of age or older. The gender makeup of the village was 50.4% male and 49.6% female.

2000 census
As of the census of 2000, there were 1,067 people, 431 households, and 286 families living in the village. The population density was 1,592.1 people per square mile (614.9/km2). There were 483 housing units at an average density of 720.7 per square mile (278.3/km2). The racial makeup of the village was 93.72% White, 1.59% African American, 0.09% Native American, 2.62% Asian, and 1.97% from two or more races. Hispanic or Latino of any race were 0.94% of the population.

There were 431 households, out of which 32.5% had children under the age of 18 living with them, 46.4% were married couples living together, 14.8% had a female householder with no husband present, and 33.6% were non-families. 28.1% of all households were made up of individuals, and 10.7% had someone living alone who was 65 years of age or older. The average household size was 2.48 and the average family size was 3.01.

In the village, the population was spread out, with 26.5% under the age of 18, 8.2% from 18 to 24, 32.5% from 25 to 44, 21.1% from 45 to 64, and 11.6% who were 65 years of age or older. The median age was 34 years. For every 100 females there were 90.2 males. For every 100 females age 18 and over, there were 87.1 males.

The median income for a household in the village was $24,821, and the median income for a family was $30,865. Males had a median income of $28,750 versus $20,536 for females. The per capita income for the village was $12,052. About 21.8% of families and 25.6% of the population were below the poverty line, including 33.3% of those under age 18 and 19.7% of those age 65 or over.

Public services
The residents of Chauncey are served by the Athens City School District and Athens High School.  Chauncey has a public library, a branch of the Athens County Public Libraries.

The community owns the  Chauncey-Dover Community Park, formerly strip mine lands acquired by the United States Forest Service and ceded to the village.

References

Villages in Athens County, Ohio
Villages in Ohio
1839 establishments in Ohio
Populated places established in 1839